Aleksandr Anatolyevich Kosmodemyansky (July 27, 1925 – April 13, 1945) was a first lieutenant and a hero of the Soviet Union, who was bestowed this title posthumously after having been killed during World War II during the capture of the settlement of Vierbrüderkrug, in the Kaporner Heath near Metgethen, just west of Königsberg, East Prussia, Germany.

He was the brother of Zoya Kosmodemyanskaya.

The settlement of imeni Alexandra Kosmodemyanskogo in Kaliningrad Oblast was renamed after him in 1956. The minor planet 1977 Shura was named in his honour, while 1793 Zoya and 2072 Kosmodemyanskaya were named for his sister and for his mother, Lyubov Kosmodemyanskaya, respectively.

References

External links 

warheroes.ru - Aleksandr Kosmodemyansky (ru)

1925 births
1945 deaths
People from Tambov Oblast
People from Kirsanovsky Uyezd
Communist Party of the Soviet Union members
Soviet Army officers
Soviet military personnel killed in World War II
Heroes of the Soviet Union